Kaulā (Nepal Bhasa: कौला) is the twelfth month in the Nepal Era calendar, the national lunar calendar of Nepal. The month coincides with Ashvin (अश्विन्) in the Hindu lunar calendar and October in the Gregorian calendar.

Kaulā begins with the new moon and the full moon falls on the 15th of the lunar month. The month is divided into the bright and dark fortnights which are known as Kaulā Thwa (कौला थ्व) and Kaulā Gā (कौला गा) respectively.

Kaulā is a festive month. On the third day of the bright fortnight, masked dances of the Goddess Rudrayani are performed in Khokna, a village to the south of Kathmandu.

The greatest event of the month is Dasain, known as Mohani in Nepal Mandala. It is the longest religious celebration in the country, starting from the 1st day of the bright fortnight and continuing till the full moon day. However, the main celebrations last for four days from the 8th to the 11th days. The festivities consist of religious services in the clan's shrine house, family feasts, sword processions and masked dances of deities.

The 13th day of the dark fortnight is the start of another great festival Tihar or Swanti. The first two days are dedicated to crows and dogs respectively. The 15th day is Lakshmi Puja when households worship the goddess of wealth in their private shrines. The day is also the last day of the lunar Nepal Era, and traditionally merchants closed their accounting books.

Days in the month

Months of the year

References

Months
Nepali calendar
Nepalese culture